Edgar Gilbert (14 June 1933 – July 2017) was a Kittitian cricketer. He played in eleven first-class matches for the Leeward Islands from 1961 to 1968. The Edgar Gilbert Sporting Complex in his home town of Molyneux is named in his honour.

See also
 List of Leeward Islands first-class cricketers

References

External links
 

1933 births
2017 deaths
Kittitian cricketers
Leeward Islands cricketers